Guardiola carinata is a rare North American species of plants in the family Asteraceae. It is found only in northern Mexico in the state of Nayarit.

Guardiola carinata is a branching woody perennial, hairless except a few hairs on the pedicels. Flower heads have both ray flowers and disc flowers.

The Guardiola carinata is a yellow color.

References

carinata
Flora of Nayarit
Plants described in 1899